David Koepp (born June 9, 1963) is an American filmmaker. Koepp is the ninth most successful screenwriter of all time in terms of U.S. box office receipts with a total gross of over $2.3 billion.

Koepp has achieved both critical and commercial success in a wide variety of genres: thriller, science fiction, comedy, action, drama, crime, superhero, horror, adventure, and fantasy.

Some of the best-known films he has written include the sci-fi adventure films Jurassic Park (1993), The Lost World: Jurassic Park (1997), and Indiana Jones and the Kingdom of the Crystal Skull (2008); the crime film Carlito's Way (1993); the action spy films Mission: Impossible (1996) and Jack Ryan: Shadow Recruit (2014); the superhero film Spider-Man (2002); the sci-fi disaster film War of the Worlds (2005) and the mystery thriller Angels & Demons (2009). Koepp has directed seven feature films over the course of his career: The Trigger Effect (1996), Stir of Echoes (1999), Secret Window (2004), Ghost Town (2008), Premium Rush (2012), Mortdecai (2015), and You Should Have Left (2020).

Early life and education
Koepp was born in Pewaukee, Wisconsin, to Donald Koepp, who owned a billboard company, and a family therapist mother. While attending Kettle Moraine High School in Wales, Wisconsin, he worked evenings and weekends at the McDonald's restaurant in Delafield. He received his bachelor's degree in film from UCLA.

Career
As a writer, Koepp worked on blockbuster Hollywood films such as Jurassic Park, Mission: Impossible, and Spider-Man. He had a cameo appearance as the "Unlucky Bastard", a minor character devoured by a T. rex roaming San Diego in The Lost World: Jurassic Park, which he co-wrote and was second unit director of. Although Koepp did not write Jurassic Park III, he did devise the film's basic storyline. Koepp later declined an offer to write a script for the series' fourth film, Jurassic World, as he felt he had nothing left to contribute to the series.

Koepp was reportedly paid $4,000,000 for his Panic Room screenplay. He wrote the screenplay for Indiana Jones and the Kingdom of the Crystal Skull and co-wrote and directed 2008's Ghost Town starring Ricky Gervais and Greg Kinnear.

Koepp's work as a director has not had quite the same box office success. His films include Secret Window, Stir of Echoes, and The Trigger Effect.

Koepp has also worked in television, creating the 2002 series Hack starring David Morse.

In 2012, Koepp directed Premium Rush, which he co-wrote with John Kamps. In an August 2011 lawsuit, Joe Quirk, the author of the 1998 novel The Ultimate Rush, accused Koepp and the makers of Premium Rush of copyright infringement. On April 2, 2013, U.S. District Judge Richard Seeborg dismissed this case, finding that the two works were not substantially similar.

On February 17, 2013, Koepp received the WGA East's Ian McClellan Hunter Award for Career Achievement.

On July 10, 2013, Lionsgate was reported to have acquired the comedic crime novel The Great Mortdecai Moustache Mystery, written by Kyril Bonfiglioli. Koepp directed the film, titled Mortdecai, from a script by Eric Aronson; Johnny Depp played the lead role of Charlie Mortdecai, and the film also featured Gwyneth Paltrow, Ewan McGregor, and Paul Bettany. Koepp adapted the Marcus Sakey novel Brilliance, which will star Will Smith and Noomi Rapace.

On March 15, 2016, The Walt Disney Company announced a fifth installment of the Indiana Jones saga, with Koepp as its screenwriter. By June 2018, Koepp ultimately backed out of the project due to his commitment to You Should Have Left, a horror drama film Koepp wrote and directed. Based on the novel of the same name by Daniel Kehlmann, You Should Have Left was released in 2020, and stars Kevin Bacon and Amanda Seyfried.

On September 3, 2019, Koepp made his novel debut with the publication of Cold Storage, a science-fiction thriller. Koepp's second novel, Aurora was published on June 7, 2022, and a film adaptation of the book is in development for Netflix, with Koepp writing the script and Kathryn Bigelow directing.

Personal life
Koepp has a wife, Melissa, and four children.

Filmography

Feature films

Television

Bibliography

References

External links
 

1963 births
Living people
20th-century American male writers
20th-century American screenwriters
21st-century American male writers
21st-century American novelists
21st-century American screenwriters
American male novelists
American male screenwriters
American male television writers
American television writers
Horror film directors
People from Pewaukee, Wisconsin
People from Wisconsin
Writers from Wisconsin
Film directors from Wisconsin
Film producers from Wisconsin
Hugo Award-winning writers
Novelists from Wisconsin
Screenwriters from Wisconsin
UCLA Film School alumni